The 1967 Inter-Cities Fairs Cup Final was the final of the ninth edition of the Inter-Cities Fairs Cup. It was played on 30 August and 6 September 1967 between Dinamo Zagreb of Yugoslavia and Leeds United of England. Zagreb won the tie 2–0 on aggregate.

Route to the final

Match details

First leg

Second leg

See also

GNK Dinamo Zagreb in European football
1966–67 Inter-Cities Fairs Cup
Leeds United F.C. in European football

References
RSSSF

2
1967
1967
Inter-Cities Fairs Cup Final 1967
Inter-Cities Fairs Cup Final 1967
1967
Inter
Inter
August 1967 sports events in the United Kingdom
September 1967 sports events in the United Kingdom
August 1967 sports events in Europe
September 1967 sports events in Europe
Sports competitions in Zagreb
1960s in Zagreb
1960s in Leeds
Sports competitions in Leeds